The Butterfly Club is a performing arts venue in Melbourne, Victoria, Australia. The club was conceived and created by artist and entrepreneur, Matthew Grant. Grant lived and worked from the building from 1993, opening it to the public in 1999. Grant sold the club in November 2003. The venue draws from a growing interest in cabaret. By 2006, the club was Melbourne's only full-time cabaret venue.

The Butterfly Club has presented over 1,000 artworks, with performers including Tim Minchin and Eddie Perfect. For 8 years, under the stewardship of David Read and Neville Sice, the venue became sustainable using an arts model which does not rely on public subsidy. 

The club, together with the Australian National Academy of Music, has played a role in developing the Melbourne Cabaret Festival, In January 2011. The Butterfly Club again changed hands to new director, Simone Pulga.

In December 2012, The Butterfly Club announced a planned relocation to a building on Carson Pl. In conjunction with this relocation, a fundraising effort through crowdfunding and social media campaigns, as well as media coverage, was launched under the tagline 'Save The Butterfly Club.' 

Following the relocation, The Butterfly Club began trading from its new home, in the Melbourne CBD, in February 2013.

References

External links
The Butterfly Club

Culture of Melbourne
Cabaret
Theatres in Melbourne
1999 establishments in Australia